Robert Gordon Buchanan (born May 3, 1961) is a retired Major League Baseball pitcher. He played during two seasons at the major league level, playing for the Cincinnati Reds and Kansas City Royals. He was drafted by the Reds in the 2nd round of the 1979 amateur draft. Buchanan played his first professional season with their Rookie league Billings Mustangs in 1979, and his last with their Triple-A club, the Nashville Sounds in 1992. He attended Riverview High School.

References

External links

1961 births
Living people
Major League Baseball pitchers
Cincinnati Reds players
Kansas City Royals players
Baseball players from Pennsylvania
Nashville Sounds players
Indianapolis Indians players
Vermont Reds players
Omaha Royals players
Syracuse Chiefs players
Tucson Toros players
Tidewater Tides players
Denver Zephyrs players
Tampa Tarpons (1957–1987) players
Cedar Rapids Reds players
Waterbury Reds players
Billings Mustangs players
Wichita Aeros players
Members of the United States National Academy of Sciences
Scientists from Pennsylvania
People from Ridley Park, Pennsylvania
Riverview High School (Sarasota, Florida) alumni